Thambi Vettothi Sundaram is a 2011 Tamil docudrama crime film written and directed by V. C. Vadivudaiyan      
screenplay by V. C. Vadivudayan It stars Karan and Anjali. The film received mixed reviews and became an average grosser. It was later dubbed into Hindi as The Acid of Life.

Plot
Thambi Vettothi Sundaram is set in Kaliyakkavilai, a town set on the state border. This place has a unique distinction: almost everyone here is educated, and quite peculiarly, almost every second person is involved in some kind of illegal business, ranging from smuggling to the brewing of illegal liquor and other such activities. This place is certainly an antithesis for all those who believe that education is the one solution to all social evils. Here, people seem to be corrupt in spite of education. Sundaram (Karan) is one from the town, well-educated, but not yet initiated into any subversive acts.

He has no idea to drift off onto the wrong side of the law, but the place and people are such that he finds it near impossible to follow a straightforward means of livelihood. He is confused, vexed, angry, and then finds Aala (Saravanan), who seems to understand his troubles; they form a jolly good duo. Who is Aala and what does the duo end up doing? Do they cleanse society, join the fray, or make enemies? In the midst of this, there is a love story as Lourd Mary (Anjali) falls for Sundaram, not without good reason.

Finally, in a fight with the don of smuggling, the don burns Sundaram's eyes with a mix of acid and chalk powder and also breaks a part of his spinal cord. Even though Sundaram kills all, he loses his eyesight and cannot stand erect for more than 15 minutes, so he then kills himself by lying under a moving bullock cart. Two years later, Mary gets Sundaram's appointment letter as a teacher and cries.

Cast
Karan as Sundaram (Vettothi Sundaram)
Anjali as Lourd Mary
Saravanan as Aala
Ganja Karuppu as Current
J. Senthilkumar as Chiluvai
Dhandapani as Mani (Chiluvai's godfather)
Shanmugarajan as Udumbu (Chiluvai's right-hand)
Balasingh as Pakku Paramasivam
Saravana Subbiah as Sundaram's friend
Vennira Aadai Moorthy as Tea Shop Owner

Production
The movie is produced by Senthil Kumar and is directed under the captaincy of Vadivudaiyan. As earlier reported, the movie is about the lives of three people in KanyaKumari district. It's inspired from true life and events and the director even took the consent of the real life people before getting on board with the script.

Soundtrack

This album was composed by Vidyasagar, the soundtrack was released on 10 June 2011. Lyrics were written by Vairamuthu.

Critical reception
The film received mixed reviews. KollyInsider.com rated it 2/5, saying: "Thambi Vettothi Sundaram, is an overdose of emotions, dreary and slow moving.". but sify.com rated it as an average fare. while supergoodmovies site appreciated the film. GetCinemas.com gave a rating of 2.5 / 5 stating "With its fresh screenplay and refreshing presentation, Thambi Vettothi Sundaram is a sure Can Watch".

References

https://www.imdb.com/title/tt4339110/reference

2011 films
2010s Tamil-language films
Films scored by Vidyasagar
Films directed by Vadivudaiyan